Serpukhovsky District is an administrative and municipal district (raion), one of the thirty-six in Moscow Oblast, Russia. It is located in the south of the oblast. Its administrative center is the city of Serpukhov (which is not administratively a part of the district). Population: 35,173 (2010 Census);

Administrative and municipal status
Within the framework of administrative divisions, Serpukhovsky District is one of the thirty-six in the oblast. The city of Serpukhov serves as its administrative center, despite being incorporated separately as a city under oblast jurisdiction—an administrative unit with the status equal to that of the districts.

As a municipal division, the district is incorporated as Serpukhovsky Municipal District. Serpukhov City Under Oblast Jurisdiction is incorporated separately from the district as Serpukhov Urban Okrug.

Notable residents 

Mikhail Kuznetsov (1913–1989), WW2 Soviet flying ace, born in Agarino village

References

Notes

Sources

Districts of Moscow Oblast
